Paul Green (born 1 June 1976) is a former English cricketer.  Green was a right-handed batsman who bowled right-arm medium pace.  He was born at Salford, Greater Manchester.

Green represented the Lancashire Cricket Board in List A cricket.  His debut List A match came against the Netherlands in the 1999 NatWest Trophy.  From 1999 to 2002, he represented the Board in 5 List A matches, the last of which came against Scotland in the 2nd round of the 2003 Cheltenham & Gloucester Trophy which was played in 2002.  In his 6 List A matches, he scored 107 runs at a batting average of 21.40, with a single half century high score of 63.  In the field he took 3 catches.  With the ball he took a single wicket at a bowling average of 47.00, with best figures of 1/32.

References

External links
Paul Green at Cricinfo
Paul Green at CricketArchive

1976 births
Living people
Cricketers from Salford
English cricketers
Lancashire Cricket Board cricketers